The 2009–10 CEV Challenge Cup was the 30th edition of the European Challenge Cup volleyball club tournament, the former CEV Cup.

The Italian club RPA-LuigiBacchi.it Perugia beat the Croatian club Mladost Zagreb in the final and achieved its first CEV Challenge Cup trophy.

Final Four
Venue:  PalaBarton, Perugia

Semi finals

|}

3rd place

|}

Final

|}

Final standing

Awards

Most Valuable Player
  Damiano Pippi (RPA-LuigiBacchi.it Perugia)
Best Scorer
  Salvador Hidalgo Oliva (SCC Berlin)
Best Opposite
 :  Ivan Mihalj (Mladost Zagreb)
Best Blocker
  Stefan Hübner (RPA-LuigiBacchi.it Perugia) 

Best Server
  Cristian Savani (RPA-LuigiBacchi.it Perugia)
Best Receiver
  Matej Černič (RPA-LuigiBacchi.it Perugia)
Best Libero
  Martin Kryštof (SCC Berlin)
Best Setter
  Giacomo Sintini (RPA-LuigiBacchi.it Perugia)

References

External links
 Official site

CEV Challenge Cup
2009 in volleyball
2010 in volleyball